The Florida Review is a national, non-profit literary journal published twice a year by the College of Arts and Humanities at the University of Central Florida.

Its artistic mission is to publish the best poetry and prose written by the world's most exciting emerging and established writers.  They have published important writers, such as David Foster Wallace, Tony Early, and Tom Chiarella before they went on to become regular contributors to The New Yorker, Harper's and The Atlantic.

The Florida Review was first published in 1972.

Layout
The magazine has featured fiction, poetry, interviews, and essays by such internationally renowned writers as Margaret Atwood, William Trowbridge, Stephen Dixon, Philip Heldrich, Grace Paley, Lorrie Moore, Mark Doty, and Tobias Wolff. Florida writers are also represented, with a notable and diverse list including Sylvia Curbello, Bob Shacochis, Philip F. Deaver, Enid Shomer, Virgil Suárez and many others.

Notable contributors
Jacob Appel
Alice Friman
Steven Harvey
Kathryn Kulpa
Peter Selgin
Lisa Stolley
Mark Wisniewski

Staff
The current staff includes:

 Lisa Roney, Editor-in-Chief
 Sara Raffel, Assistant Managing Editor
 Sara Raffel and Rebecca Cobb, Managing Editors
 Lisa Roney and Victoria Campbell, Fiction Editors
 Brian Druckenmiller, Assistant Fiction Editor
 Kenneth Hart, Poetry Editor
 Judith Roney, Assistant Poetry Editor
 Nathan Holic, Graphic Narrative Editor
 Mike Shier, Creative Nonfiction Editor
 Ren Morrison and Lorinda Clark, Design/Art Direction
 Judith Roney, Book Review Editor
 Susan Fallows, Chapbook Coordinator/Editor

See also

 Centric
 Central Florida Future
 List of literary magazines

References

External links
 The Florida Review Official Site

Literary magazines published in the United States
Biannual magazines published in the United States
Magazines established in 1972
Magazines published in Florida
University of Central Florida
1972 establishments in Florida